Olena Pukhaieva (born 4 February 1961) is a Ukrainian rower. She competed in the women's eight event at the 1988 Summer Olympics.

References

1961 births
Living people
Ukrainian female rowers
Olympic rowers of the Soviet Union
Rowers at the 1988 Summer Olympics
Place of birth missing (living people)
20th-century Ukrainian women